Thomas Erskine, 2nd Lord Erskine (died 1494), was a Scottish peer. His family was claimant to the earldom of Mar; this was recognized in 1565 for Thomas' descendant, John Erskine. Following a dynastic dispute in the 19th century, Thomas was acknowledged, retrospectively, as the 14th Earl.

Erskine was the son of Robert Erskine, 1st Lord Erskine, and Elizabeth, daughter of David Lindsay, 1st Earl of Crawford. He married Janet Douglas. They had several children. Of their daughters: 
 Helen, married Humphrey Colquhoun of Luss, son of Sir John Colquhoun of Luss;
Mariota, married William Keith, 1st Earl Marischal;   
 Elizabeth, married Sir Alexander (Seton) Gordon of Touch and Tullibody (the son of Alexander Gordon, 1st Earl of Huntly (died 15 July 1470) and Lady Eqlidia Hay - daughter of Sir John Hay, of Tullibody, and Lady Margaret Stewart, of Roulstoun).

Lord Erskine died in 1494 and was succeeded, as 3rd Lord Erskine, by his son, Alexander (died 1509) who married Christian Crichton the daughter of Sir Robert of Sanquhar by his wife, Lady Elizabeth.  Their son, the 4th Lord was Robert Erskine (died 9 September 1513, Flodden) married in 1485, to Isobel Campbell, daughter of Sir George by his wife, Lady Kennedy.

References

 

Lords of Parliament (pre-1707)
Thomas
15th-century Scottish peers
Earls or mormaers of Mar
15th-century births
1494 deaths
Year of birth unknown
Lords Erskine